The 2008–09 season of the Tunisian Ligue Professionnelle 2 began on 16 August 2008 and will end on 27 May 2009. Espoir Sportif de Hammam-Sousse are the reigning champions. The competition saw the return of two previous participants, US Ben Guerdane and STIR S Zarzouna from Ligue Professionnelle 3.

Member clubs 2008-09
AS Ariana
AS Djerba
AS Gabès
CS Korba
CS M'saken
EM Mahdia
ES Beni-Khalled
ES Zarzis
JS Kairouanaise
Olympique du Kef
SA Menzel Bourguiba
Stade Gabèsien
STIR S Zarzouna
US Ben Guerdane

Standings

Results

Promotions and relegations

Promoted to CLP-1 on 2008-09
 ES Zarzis
 JS Kairouanaise

Relegated from CLP-1 on 2008-09
 AS Marsa
 Jendouba Sport

Promoted from CLP-3 on 2008-09
 Spot 1
 Spot 2

Relegated to CLP-3 on 2008–09
 AS Ariana
 STIR S Zarzouna

Television rights
The Communication bureau of the FTF attributed the broadcasting rights of the Tunisian Ligue Professionnelle 2 to Hannibal TV.

References

External links
 2008–09 Ligue 2 at rsssf.com

Tun
Tunisian Ligue Professionnelle 2 seasons
2008–09 in Tunisian football